Bilal Abdullahi Hersi (born 29 October 2001) is a Somali footballer who plays as a forward for the Siena Saints.

Club career
Born in Decatur in the United States, Hersi attended Lewiston High School, captaining the side for two years. Before Hersi joined Siena College, he played for Seacoast United Maine and New England Revolution at youth level. In 2020, Hersi scored one goal in eight games for the Siena Saints. The following year, Hersi scored 5 goals in 19 appearances for the Siena Saints.

International career
In November 2020, Hersi was called up for Somalia's under-20 squad for the country’s 2021 Africa U-20 Cup of Nations qualification campaign.

On 23 March 2022, Hersi made his debut for Somalia in a 3–0 loss against Eswatini in the qualification for the 2023 Africa Cup of Nations.

References

2001 births
Living people
Association football forwards
American soccer players
People with acquired Somali citizenship
Somalian footballers
Lewiston High School (Maine) alumni
American people of Somali descent
People from Decatur, Georgia
Somalia international footballers
Siena Saints men's soccer players